Matthew Fowler JP MP (1845 – 13 June 1898), was a British Liberal Party politician.

Fowler was the son of Alderman Fowler who was five times Mayor of Durham. Like his father Fowler was also Mayor of Durham. He was appointed a Justice of the peace. He was the successful Liberal candidate for the City of Durham at the 1892 General Election. He was re-elected at the 1895 General Election. Fowler was elected an Alderman of Durham City in 1897.

References

1845 births
1898 deaths
UK MPs 1892–1895
UK MPs 1895–1900
Liberal Party (UK) MPs for English constituencies
Members of the Parliament of the United Kingdom for City of Durham